Civic is something related to a city or municipality. It also can refer to multiple other things:

General
Civics, the science of comparative government
Civic engagement, the connection one feels with their larger community
Civic center, a community focal point
Civic nationalism
Civic Theatre (disambiguation), a name given to a number of theatres around the world
Civic virtue

Specific places
Civic, Christchurch, a Category II heritage building in the Christchurch Central City
Civic, Australian Capital Territory, the central business district of Canberra, Australia

Music
 Civic (band), an Australian rock band

Other
Honda Civic, a car produced by the Honda Motor Co.
Campaign for Innocent Victims in Conflict (CIVIC), a humanitarian organization

See also
 Civil (disambiguation), civilian
 City
 Citizen